Candace Cameron Bure (born Candace Helaine Cameron; April 6, 1976) is an American actress, producer, author and television personality. She is known for portraying D.J. Tanner on Full House and its sequel series Fuller House, and a number of roles in Hallmark Channel original productions—including the title character in their adaptations of the Aurora Teagarden novel series.

In 2014, she was a contestant on season 18 of Dancing with the Stars, finishing in third place. Bure also starred as Summer van Horne on Make It or Break It. From 2015 to 2016, she was a co-host of the daytime television talk show The View. In 2022, Bure became chief content officer of Great American Media.

Early life
Cameron was born in Panorama City, Los Angeles, California on April 6, 1976, to Robert and Barbara Cameron.Candace is the younger sister of Kirk Cameron.

Career
Cameron guest-starred in roles on shows such as St. Elsewhere, Growing Pains, and Who's the Boss?. In 1985, she portrayed Jennifer Bates in an episode of the sitcom Punky Brewster. In 1987, she had a role as the youngest sister of Eric Stoltz in the teen comedy Some Kind of Wonderful.

Also in 1987, Cameron began the most prominent role of her career on the ensemble sitcom Full House, as Donna Jo "D.J." Tanner, the oldest daughter of Bob Saget's Danny Tanner. She was cast throughout the eight seasons of the series until its end in 1995.

While on Full House, Cameron was also featured in Camp Cucamonga, an adventure comedy. She guest-starred in the failed pilot Real Mature, and in an episode of Bill Nye The Science Guy as "Candace the Science Gal". She also appeared in the Tom Hanks and Sally Field feature film Punchline.

Cameron hosted the Nickelodeon Kids' Choice Awards in 1990 with Full House co-star Dave Coulier and David Faustino, and again in 1994 with Joey Lawrence and Marc Weiner.

After Full House 

After Full House ended in 1995, Bure guest-starred on Cybill and Boy Meets World.

Bure also appeared in numerous NBC made-for-TV movies, including No One Would Tell, playing an abused teen; She Cried No, as a date-raped teen; and NightScream, a mystery.

After giving birth, Bure took a self-imposed hiatus from television and film to focus on her family. In the 2000s, she appeared as an interviewee on the retrospective I Love the '80s and I Love the '80s Strikes Back. She would later co-host 50 Cutest Child Stars: All Grown Up on the E! network, along with Keshia Knight Pulliam of The Cosby Show fame.

In 2007, Bure guest-starred on the sitcom That's So Raven. The following year, she co-starred with Randy Travis in The Wager and starred with Tom Arnold in the television movie Moonlight and Mistletoe for the Hallmark Channel in 2008. Bure returned to television in 2009 and was cast in Make It or Break It, which ended in 2012.

On March 4, 2014, Bure was announced to compete on season 18 of Dancing with the Stars, partnering with Mark Ballas. The couple made it to the finals and ended in third place behind Meryl Davis and Amy Purdy who took first and second place, respectively.

It was announced in 2015 that Bure would reprise her role as D.J. Tanner in the 2016 Netflix spinoff Fuller House, her character now going by D.J. Tanner-Fuller. Filming began that July 2015. Bure was a co-host of The View in season 19 and 20. In March 2016, Fuller House was picked up for a second season. On December 8, 2016, Bure announced that she was leaving The View due to commitment clashes between Fuller House and Hallmark Channel projects and family life. In January 2019, Fuller House was renewed for its fifth and final season to air later that year. The series concluded on June 2, 2020.

Hallmark Channel work 
Bure has acted in over two dozen Hallmark Channel movies, including the 2017 Switched for Christmas, and as the titular character in the eighteen-film Aurora Teagarden movie series for Hallmark Movies & Mysteries. Bure also produced and hosted the Hallmark Channel special Christmas in America. Bure served as the host of the 26th annual Movieguide Awards for the network on February 8, 2019, along with her daughter Natasha.

Great American Media 
In April 2022, it was announced that Bure would take an executive role at GAC Media—a company led by former Hallmark Channel head Bill Abbott—to develop, produce, and star in original romantic comedy and holiday movies and series for GAC Family (now Great American Family) and GAC Living. Bure became chief content officer of the company.

In a November 2022 interview with The Wall Street Journal, Bure stated that she had left Hallmark because it was a "completely different network than when I started", and wanted to "tell stories that have more meaning and purpose and depth behind them"—including those with stronger faith-based themes (albeit not being "off-putting to the unbeliever or someone who shares a different faith"). Bure explained that Great American Media "wanted to promote faith programming and good family entertainment", and stated, "I think that Great American Family will keep traditional marriage at the core." 

Bure's remarks were believed to be an allusion to a trend towards progressive themes, including recognition of the LGBT community, in Hallmark Channel productions. Abbott left Hallmark Channel in early 2020, shortly after it faced criticism for briefly pulling a Zola.com commercial depicting a lesbian couple. In response to criticism over the comments regarding "traditional" marriage by other celebrities such as Hilarie Burton and JoJo Siwa, Bure stated that people of various "identities" worked on Great American Media programming, and that "all of you who know me, know beyond question that I have great love and affection for all people." Of Bure's implication that Great American Media productions would never depict same-sex couples, Abbott stated to the Wall Street Journal, "It's certainly the year 2022, so we're aware of the trends. There's no whiteboard that says, 'Yes, this' or 'No, we'll never go here.'"

Books
Cameron Bure has written four books: A New York Times best seller, Reshaping It All: Motivation for Physical and Spiritual Fitness, published in January 2011; Balancing It All: My Story of Juggling Priorities and Purpose, published in January 2014; Dancing Through Life: Steps of Courage and Conviction, published in August 2015; and Kind is the New Classy: The Power of Living Graciously, published in April 2018.

In a September 2015 interview, Bure revealed that Dancing Through Life discloses more personal issues than her first two books. In an April 2018 interview, Bure shared that Kind Is the New Classy conveyed the idea of staying centered and practicing graciousness towards others.

Personal life

Bure married Russian NHL hockey player Valeri Bure on June 22, 1996. They were first introduced at a charity hockey game by her Full House co-star Dave Coulier. They have a daughter and two sons. Their daughter Natasha competed in season 11 of The Voice at the age of 18 and played the younger version of her mother’s lead character in the final Aurora Teagarden Mystery. Cameron’s brother-in-law is hockey Hall of Famer Pavel Bure.

Bure is a conservative Republican. She became a Christian at the age of 12, and she credits her faith as the binding force in her marriage. She has revealed she suffered from bulimia nervosa in her early twenties.

Bure is a supporter of Compassion International. The Bure family sponsors three children through the organization.

Filmography

Film

Television

Music videos
 "Joy" (2018) by For King & Country, as News Anchor

Awards and nominations

References

External links

 
 
 
 

1976 births
Living people
20th-century American actresses
20th-century Christians
21st-century American actresses
21st-century American women writers
21st-century Christians
Actresses from Los Angeles
American child actresses
American Christians
American film actresses
21st-century American memoirists
American television actresses
American television talk show hosts
California Republicans
Christians from California
Film producers from California
Participants in American reality television series
People from Panorama City, Los Angeles
American women memoirists
Writers from Los Angeles
Candace
American women film producers